Arocatus rusticus, the swan plant seed bug, is a species of seed bug in the family Lygaeidae. It is found in Australia and New Zealand.

References

External links

 

Lygaeidae
Hemiptera of Oceania
Insects described in 1867